The Yarmukian culture was a Pottery Neolithic A (PNA) culture of the ancient Levant. It was the first culture in prehistoric Israel and one of the oldest in the Levant to make use of pottery. The Yarmukian derives its name from the Yarmuk River, which flows near its type site of Sha'ar HaGolan, near Kibbutz Sha'ar HaGolan at the foot of the Golan Heights. This culture existed alongside the Lodian, or Jericho IX culture and the Nizzanim culture to the south.

Recent theory
In 2015, a salvage excavation brought to light a prehistoric site near Beit Hilkia and the Revivim quarry, with findings from the Yarmukian, Late Chalcolithic, and the Middle Bronze Age IIA–IIB. Somewhat surprising was the discovery of a typical Yarmukian-style fired clay figurine of a fertility goddess, the southernmost such finding. Of 163 found up to that date, the vast majority had been discovered in the main area known for its Yarmukian settlements, in and around the northern type-site of Sha'ar Hagolan, with just two exceptions further to the south. This new finding led to speculations that much of the Southern Levant might have been inhabited by a contiguous civilization during the time (c. 6400–6000 BCE), with differences in pottery types being more significant to today's archaeologists than to people living back then.

Related sites

Although the Yarmukian culture occupied limited regions of northern Israel and northern Jordan, Yarmukian pottery has been found elsewhere in the region, including the Habashan Street excavations in Tel Aviv and as far north as Byblos, Lebanon.

Besides the site at Sha'ar HaGolan, by 1999, 20 other Yarmukian sites have been identified in Israel, the West Bank, Jordan and Lebanon. These include, alphabetically:

Israel
 Beisamoun, Hula Valley
 Hazorea (Jezreel Valley, Israel)
 HaBashan Street, Tel Aviv, 500 m south of the Yarkon River (Coastal Plain, Israel)
 Hamadiya (central Jordan Valley, Israel)
 Munhata (central Jordan Valley, Israel)
 Nahal Betzet II settlement (Northern Coastal Plain, Israel)
 Nahal Zehora II settlement (southern Jezreel Valley, Menashe Hills, Israel)
 Nahal Zippori 3 settlement (Western Galilee, Israel)
 Tel Kabri (Northern Coastal Plain, Israel)
 Tel Megiddo (Jezreel Valley, Israel) - Yarmukian settlement at the base of the tell
 Tel Qishyon/Qishion/Kishion (wrongly spelled as Tel Kishon by the press) near Mount Tabor (Lower Galilee, Israel)

Jordan
 Ain Ghazal (Jordan)
 'Ain Rahub (Jordan)
 Jebel Abu Thawwab (Jordan)
 Wadi Shueib (Jordan)

Lebanon
 Byblos (Lebanon)

West Bank
 Tel Far'ah (North) (Samaria Hills, West Bank)
 Wadi Murabba'at Cave (Judaean desert, West Bank)
 Wadi Qanah Cave (western Samaria Hills, West Bank)

See also
 Lodian culture
 Wadi Raba culture

References

Further reading
 Stekelis M. 1972. The Yarmukian Culture. Jerusalem: Magnes Press.
 Garfinkel Y. 1993. The Yarmukian Culture in Israel. Paléorient, Vol 19, No. 1, pp. 115 – 134.
 Garfinkel Y. 1999. The Yarmukians, Neolithic Art from Sha'ar Hagolan. Jerusalem: Bible Lands Museum (Exhibition Catalogue). 
 Garfinkel Y. and Miller M. 2002. Sha'ar Hagolan Vol 1. Neolithic Art in Context. Oxford: Oxbow.
 Garfinkel Y. 2004. The Goddess of Sha'ar Hagolan. Excavations at a Neolithic Site in Israel. Jerusalem: Israel Exploration Society (Hebrew version published in 2002 as: Sha'ar Hagolan. Neolithic Art in the Jordan Valley. Jerusalem: Israel Exploration Society). 
 Garfinkel Y. and Ben Shlomo D. In press. Sha'ar Hagolan Vol. 2. Qedem. Jerusalem: Institute of Archaeology, Hebrew University. 
 Garfinkel Y., Vered A. and Bar-Yosef O. 2006. The Domestication of Water: The Neolithic Well of Sha'ar Hagolan, Jordan Valley, Israel. Antiquity 80: 686–696.
 Obaidat Daifallah 1995. "Die neolithische Keramik aus Abu Thawwab/Jordanien". Berlin, ex Oriente.

External links
 

Archaeological cultures in Palestine
Archaeological cultures in Lebanon
Archaeological cultures in Jordan
Prehistoric sites in Israel
6th-millennium BC establishments
Archaeological cultures in Israel
Late Neolithic